Vallely  is a surname of Irish origin, possibly deriving from Irish Mac Giolla Mhuire, Mac Giolla Mhura or Mac Giolla Bhearshúiligh. Bearers include:

 Bill Vallely, US illustrator
 Cillian Vallely, Irish traditional musician
 Jim Vallely, US TV producer and screenwriter
 John Vallely, US former basketball player
 Mike Vallely, US skateboarder
 Niall Vallely, Irish traditional musician
 Paul Vallely, UK author, journalist, and writer on philanthropy, religion, ethics and development issues
 Paul E. Vallely, US soldier and military consultant for Fox News
 Simon Vallily, British boxer

Irish families